Heather Mandoli (born October 25, 1982, in Kelowna, British Columbia) is a Canadian rower.

She finished in fourth place at the 2008 Summer Olympic Games in Beijing, China in the women's eights with Ashley Brzozowicz, Darcy Marquardt, Buffy-Lynne Williams, Jane Thornton, Romina Stefancic, Sarah Bonikowsky, Andréanne Morin and cox Lesley Thompson-Willie.

References

External links
 Profile at Rowing Canada

1982 births
Canadian female rowers
Living people
Olympic rowers of Canada
Rowers at the 2008 Summer Olympics
Sportspeople from Kelowna